The A. F. Chapman House is a historic house located at 115 South Monroe Street in Watkins Glen, Schuyler County, New York.

Description and history 
It was built in 1870–1873 in the Gothic Revival style and modified in about 1888–1894. It is a -story, High Victorian/Queen Anne–style building with a steeply pitched gable roof. It features a three-story tower with Queen Anne style details.

It was listed on the National Register of Historic Places on December 8, 1997.

References

Houses on the National Register of Historic Places in New York (state)
Queen Anne architecture in New York (state)
Gothic Revival architecture in New York (state)
Houses completed in 1873
Houses in Schuyler County, New York
National Register of Historic Places in Schuyler County, New York